Jack Hiscox (born 23 March 1995) is a former professional Australian rules footballer who played for the Sydney Swans in the Australian Football League (AFL). He was drafted by the Sydney Swans with their third selection and thirty-eighth overall in the 2014 national draft. He made his debut in the one point loss against  in round 8, 2016 at the Melbourne Cricket Ground. At the conclusion of the 2016 season, he was delisted by Sydney.

Hiscox attended Newington College, completing his HSC in 2012. At Newington he was a star middle-distance athlete, winning the Ellison Stewart Cup for 800 and 1500m running.

References

External links

1995 births
Living people
People educated at Newington College
Sydney Swans players
Sydney University Australian National Football Club players
Australian rules footballers from New South Wales